Clive Barden  (born 19 May 1979) is an English former professional darts player. His nickname was Hot Dog.

Career

Barden made his BDO World Darts Championship debut in 2012. He was defeated by Ted Hankey 2–3 in the first round.

He is a painter and decorator by trade and plays his darts for the Kent County team. He won the 2010 Denmark Open and reached the final of the 2011 Scottish Open.

World Championship results

BDO
 2012: First round (lost to Ted Hankey 2-3)

References

External links
Official website (archived)

1979 births
Living people
English darts players
House painters
British Darts Organisation players
Sportspeople from Dover, Kent